Julian Seymour Schwinger (February 12, 1918 – July 16, 1994) was a Nobel Prize winning American theoretical physicist. He is best known for his work on quantum electrodynamics (QED), in particular for developing a relativistically invariant perturbation theory, and for renormalizing QED to one loop order. Schwinger was a physics professor at several universities.

Schwinger is recognized as one of the greatest physicists of the twentieth century, responsible for much of modern quantum field theory, including a variational approach, and the equations of motion for quantum fields. He developed the first electroweak model, and the first example of confinement in 1+1 dimensions. He is responsible for the theory of multiple neutrinos, Schwinger terms, and the theory of the spin-3/2 field.

Biography

Early life and career
Julian Seymour Schwinger was born in New York City, to Ashkenazi Jewish parents, Belle (née Rosenfeld) and Benjamin Schwinger, a garment manufacturer, who had emigrated from Poland to the United States. Both his father and his mother's parents were prosperous clothing manufacturers, although the family business declined after the Wall Street Crash of 1929. The family followed the Orthodox Jewish tradition. Julian's older brother Harold Schwinger was born in 1911, seven years before Julian who was born in 1918.

Schwinger was a precocious student. He attended the Townsend Harris High School from 1932 to 1934, a highly regarded high school for gifted students at the time. During high school, Julian had already started reading Physical Review papers by authors such as Paul Dirac in the library of the City College of New York, in whose campus Townsend Harris was then located.

In the fall of 1934, Schwinger entered the City College of New York as an undergraduate. CCNY automatically accepted all Townsend Harris graduates at the time, and both institutions offered free tuition. Due to his intense interest in physics and mathematics, Julian performed very well in those subjects despite often skipping classes and learning directly from books. On the other hand, his lack of interest for other topics such as English led to academic conflicts with teachers of those subjects.

After Julian had joined CCNY, his brother Harold, who had previously graduated from CCNY, asked his ex-classmate Lloyd Motz to "get to know [Julian]". Lloyd was a CCNY physics instructor and Ph.D. candidate at Columbia University at the time. Lloyd made the acquaintance, and soon recognized Julian's talent. Noticing Schwinger's academic problems, Lloyd decided to ask Isidor Isaac Rabi who he knew at Columbia for help. Rabi also immediately recognized Schwinger's capabilities on their first meeting, and then made arrangements to award Schwinger with a scholarship to study at Columbia. At first Julian's bad grades in some subjects at CCNY prevented the scholarship award. But Rabi persisted and showed an unpublished paper on quantum electrodynamics written by Schwinger to Hans Bethe, who happened to be passing by New York. Bethe's approval of the paper and his reputation in that domain were then enough to secure the scholarship for Julian, who then transferred to Columbia. His academic situation at Columbia was much better than at CCNY. He accepted into the Phi Beta Kappa society and received his B.A. in 1936.

During Schwinger's graduate studies, Rabi felt that it would be good for Julian to visit other institutions around the country, and Julian was awarded a travelling fellowship for the year 37/38 which he spent at working with Gregory Breit and Eugene Wigner. During this time, Schwinger, who previously had already had the habit of working until late at night, went further and made the day/night switch more complete, working at night and sleeping during the day, a habit he would carry throughout his career. Schwinger later commented that this switch was in part a way to retain greater intellectual independence and avoid being "dominated" by Breit and Wigner by simply reducing the duration of contact with them by working different hours.

Schwinger obtained his PhD overseen by Rabi in 1939 at the age of 21.

During the fall of 1939 Schwinger started working at the University of California, Berkeley under J. Robert Oppenheimer, where he stayed for two years as an NRC fellow.

Career
After having worked with Oppenheimer, Schwinger's first regular academic appointment was at Purdue University in 1941. While on leave from Purdue, he worked at the MIT Radiation Laboratory instead of at the Los Alamos National Laboratory during World War II. He provided theoretical support for the development of radar. After the war, Schwinger left Purdue for Harvard University, where he taught from 1945 to 1974. In 1966 he became the Eugene Higgins professor of physics at Harvard.

Schwinger developed an affinity for Green's functions from his radar work, and he used these methods to formulate quantum field theory in terms of local Green's functions in a relativistically invariant way. This allowed him to calculate unambiguously the first corrections to the electron magnetic moment in quantum electrodynamics. Earlier non-covariant work had arrived at infinite answers, but the extra symmetry in his methods allowed Schwinger to isolate the correct finite corrections.

Schwinger developed renormalization, formulating quantum electrodynamics unambiguously to one-loop order.

In the same era, he introduced non-perturbative methods into quantum field theory, by calculating the rate at which electron–positron pairs are created by tunneling in an electric field, a process now known as the "Schwinger effect." This effect could not be seen in any finite order in perturbation theory.

Schwinger's foundational work on quantum field theory constructed the modern framework of field correlation functions and their equations of motion. His approach started with a quantum action and allowed bosons and fermions to be treated equally for the first time, using a differential form of Grassman integration. He gave elegant proofs for the spin-statistics theorem and the CPT theorem, and noted that the field algebra led to anomalous Schwinger terms in various classical identities, because of short distance singularities. These were foundational results in field theory, instrumental for the proper understanding of anomalies.

In other notable early work, Rarita and Schwinger formulated the abstract Pauli and Fierz theory of the spin-3/2 field in a concrete form, as a vector of Dirac spinors, Rarita–Schwinger equation. In order for the spin-3/2 field to interact consistently, some form of supersymmetry is required, and Schwinger later regretted that he had not followed up on this work far enough to discover supersymmetry.

Schwinger discovered that neutrinos come in multiple varieties, one for the electron and one for the muon. Nowadays there are known to be three light neutrinos; the third is the partner of the tau lepton.

In the 1960s, Schwinger formulated and analyzed what is now known as the Schwinger model, quantum electrodynamics in one space and one time dimension, the first example of a confining theory. He was also the first to suggest an electroweak gauge theory, an  gauge group spontaneously broken to electromagnetic  at long distances. This was extended by his student Sheldon Glashow into the accepted pattern of electroweak unification. He attempted to formulate a theory of quantum electrodynamics with point magnetic monopoles, a program which met with limited success because monopoles are strongly interacting when the quantum of charge is small.

Having supervised 73 doctoral dissertations, Schwinger is known as one of the most prolific graduate advisors in physics. Four of his students won Nobel prizes: Roy Glauber, Benjamin Roy Mottelson, Sheldon Glashow and Walter Kohn (in chemistry).

Schwinger had a mixed relationship with his colleagues, because he always pursued independent research, different from mainstream fashion. In particular, Schwinger developed the source theory, a phenomenological theory for the physics of elementary particles, which is a predecessor of the modern effective field theory. It treats quantum fields as long-distance phenomena and uses auxiliary 'sources' that resemble currents in classical field theories. The source theory is a mathematically consistent field theory with clearly derived phenomenological results. The criticisms by his Harvard colleagues led Schwinger to leave the faculty in 1972 for UCLA.  It is a story widely told that Steven Weinberg, who inherited Schwinger's paneled office in Lyman Laboratory, there found a pair of old shoes, with the implied message, "think you can fill these?" At UCLA, and for the rest of his career, Schwinger continued to develop the source theory and its various applications.

After 1989 Schwinger took a keen interest in the non-mainstream research of cold fusion. He wrote eight theory papers about it. He resigned from the American Physical Society after their refusal to publish his papers. He felt that cold fusion research was being suppressed and academic freedom violated. He wrote, "The pressure for conformity is enormous. I have experienced it in editors' rejection of submitted papers, based on venomous criticism of anonymous referees. The replacement of impartial reviewing by censorship will be the death of science."

In his last publications, Schwinger proposed a theory of sonoluminescence as a long-distance quantum radiative phenomenon associated not with atoms, but with fast-moving surfaces in the collapsing bubble, where there are discontinuities in the dielectric constant. The mechanism of sonoluminescence now supported by experiments focuses on superheated gas inside the bubble as the source of the light.

Schwinger was jointly awarded the Nobel Prize in Physics in 1965 for his work on quantum electrodynamics (QED), along with Richard Feynman and Shin'ichirō Tomonaga. Schwinger's awards and honors were numerous even before his Nobel win. They include the first Albert Einstein Award (1951), the U.S. National Medal of Science (1964), honorary D.Sc. degrees from Purdue University (1961) and Harvard University (1962), and the Nature of Light Award of the U.S. National Academy of Sciences (1949). In 1987, Schwinger received the Golden Plate Award of the American Academy of Achievement.

Schwinger and Feynman
As a famous physicist, Schwinger was often compared to another legendary physicist of his generation, Richard Feynman. Schwinger was more formally inclined and favored symbolic manipulations in quantum field theory. He worked with local field operators, and found relations between them, and he felt that physicists should understand the algebra of local fields, no matter how paradoxical it was. By contrast, Feynman was more intuitive, believing that the physics could be extracted entirely from the Feynman diagrams, which gave a particle picture. Schwinger commented on Feynman diagrams in the following way,

Schwinger disliked Feynman diagrams because he felt that they made the student focus on the particles and forget about local fields, which in his view inhibited understanding. He went so far as to ban them altogether from his class, although he understood them perfectly well. The true difference is however deeper, and it was expressed by Schwinger in the following passage,

Despite sharing the Nobel Prize, Schwinger and Feynman had a different approach to quantum electrodynamics and to quantum field theory in general. Feynman used a regulator, while Schwinger was able to formally renormalize to one loop without an explicit regulator. Schwinger believed in the formalism of local fields, while Feynman had faith in the particle paths. They followed each other's work closely, and each respected the other. On Feynman's death, Schwinger described him as

Death

Schwinger died of pancreatic cancer. These symbols refer to his calculation of the correction ("anomalous") to the magnetic moment of the electron.

See also
List of things named after Julian Schwinger

Selected publications
 
 
 
 
 Feshbach, H., Schwinger, J. and J. A. Harr. "Effect of Tensor Range in Nuclear Two-Body Problems", Computation Laboratory of Harvard University, United States Department of Energy (through predecessor agency the Atomic Energy Commission) (November 1949).
 
 Schwinger, J. "On Angular Momentum", Harvard University, Nuclear Development Associates, Inc., United States Department of Energy (through predecessor agency the Atomic Energy Commission) (January 26, 1952).
 Schwinger, J. "The Theory of Quantized Fields. II", Harvard University, United States Department of Energy (through predecessor agency the Atomic Energy Commission) (1951).
 Schwinger, J. "The Theory of Quantizied Fields. Part 3", Harvard University, United States Department of Energy (through predecessor agency the Atomic Energy Commission) (May 1953).
 Schwinger, J. Einstein's Legacy (1986). Scientific American Library. 2012 e-book

References

Further reading
Mehra, Jagdish, and Milton, Kimball A. (2000) Climbing the Mountain: the scientific biography of Julian Schwinger. Oxford University Press.
 Revised version published as (2007) "Julian Schwinger: From Nuclear Physics and Quantum Electrodynamics to Source Theory and Beyond," Physics in Perspective 9: 70–114.
 
Ng, Y. Jack, ed. (1996) Julian Schwinger: The Physicist, the Teacher, and the Man. Singapore: World Scientific. .

External links

  including the Nobel Lecture, December 11, 1965 Relativistic Quantum Field Theory
 

1918 births
1994 deaths
Nobel laureates in Physics
American Nobel laureates
Theoretical physicists
American people of Polish-Jewish descent
20th-century American physicists
Jewish American scientists
Jewish physicists
National Medal of Science laureates
Columbia Graduate School of Arts and Sciences alumni
Columbia College (New York) alumni
Harvard University faculty
Purdue University faculty
University of California, Los Angeles faculty
Burials at Mount Auburn Cemetery
Townsend Harris High School alumni
Cold fusion
Particle physicists
Scientists from New York (state)
Quantum physicists
Fellows of the American Physical Society